Nicolás Ibáñez (born 16 January 1992) is an Argentine professional footballer who plays as a forward. He is currently a free agent.

Career
Ibáñez started his senior footballing career with Lanús of the Argentine Primera División, he didn't appear competitively for the first-team but was loaned out on two occasions. On 2 August 2012, Ibáñez joined Primera B Nacional side Gimnasia y Esgrima. He made his professional debut on 20 August during a goalless draw with Nueva Chicago. In the following October, Ibáñez scored the first two goals of his career in matches against Banfield and Crucero del Norte. In July 2013, Ibáñez was loaned to Primera B Metropolitana's Flandria. Twenty-nine appearances followed as Flandria were relegated to Primera C.

On 18 August 2014, Ibáñez was signed permanently by Tiro Federal of Torneo Federal A. His first appearance arrived on 24 August versus Talleres, which was followed by thirteen further appearances and one goal during 2014. 2015 saw Ibáñez sign for fellow Torneo Federal A team San Lorenzo. He went on to score six goals, including a brace against Américo Tesorieri on 4 October, in thirty appearances. In June 2016, Ibáñez joined Primera B Metropolitana club Deportivo Español.

Career statistics
.

References

External links

1992 births
Living people
People from Quilmes
Argentine footballers
Association football forwards
Argentine Primera División players
Primera Nacional players
Primera B Metropolitana players
Torneo Federal A players
Club Atlético Lanús footballers
Gimnasia y Esgrima de Jujuy footballers
Flandria footballers
Tiro Federal footballers
Deportivo Español footballers
Sportspeople from Buenos Aires Province